Trance Syndicate was an independent record label founded in 1990 by King Coffey, drummer of Austin, Texas band the Butthole Surfers.  Its first release was Crust's The Sacred Heart of Crust EP.  From 1990 to 1999, when the label closed down, Trance Syndicate released albums by several notable Texan bands and artists, including Pain Teens, Bedhead, Ed Hall, American Analog Set, Furry Things, …And You Will Know Us by the Trail of Dead and Roky Erickson.

Although defunct, Trance Syndicate is survived by the Emperor Jones label, formerly an arm of Trance.

Roster 
 …And You Will Know Us by the Trail of Dead
 A.C. Acoustics
 Bedhead
 Butthole Surfers
 Cherubs
 Crunt
 Crust
 Desafinado
 Distorted Pony
 Drain
 Ed Hall
 Eight Frozen Modules
 Electric Company
 Furry Things
 johnboy
 Labradford
 Monroe Mustang
 The Pain Teens
 Paul Newman
 Roky Erickson
 Sixteen Deluxe
 Starfish
 Stars of the Lid
 Sweet Pea
 Windsor for the Derby

Discography

See also 
 List of record labels

References

External links 
 Trance Syndicate Records' Legacy
 The Complete Trance Syndicate Discography

 
Record labels established in 1990
Record labels disestablished in 1998
Defunct record labels of the United States
American independent record labels
Alternative rock record labels